This is a list of the cattle breeds usually considered to have originated in Spain.

References

 
Cattle